Come was a British noise music project, which was founded in 1979 by William Bennett.  In the short time of its existence it had such prominent members as Daniel Miller and J. G. Thirlwell. Bennett would later end the project in 1980 in favor for his then newly formed power electronics project Whitehouse, however a second studio album under the Come moniker was released in 1981 titled I'm Jack.  The independent record label Come Organisation was created as a result of the lack of interest other labels showed in the group's recordings. They never performed live.

While all of their material is largely out-of-print, most of their Rampton LP can be found on the Susan Lawly double disc compilation Anthology 1 Come Organisation Archives 1979-1980, and the entirety of I'm Jack is included on Anthology 2 Come Organisation Archives 2 1981-1982.

Discography

Studio albums
Rampton (1979)
I'm Jack (1981)

Singles
"Come" / "Shaved Slits" (1979)

Compilation appearances

See also
 Nurse with Wound list

References

External links
 Come profile on last.fm
 Come profile on discogs.org
 Come Discogs page

British noise rock groups